St George's Hill is a  private gated community in Weybridge, Surrey, United Kingdom. The estate has golf and tennis clubs, as well as approximately 420 houses. Land ownership is divided between homes with gardens, belonging to home owners, and the estate roads and verges belonging to its residents' association. The hill first served as a home and leisure location to celebrities and successful entrepreneurs on its division into lots in the 1910s and 1920s when Walter George Tarrant built its first homes. In a survey, most roads in the estate showed an average house sale price of over £5,500,000, with many properties selling for in excess of £15m and a handful selling for between £20m & £30m, meaning it is one of the most expensive and exclusive places to live in the UK and worldwide.

History
In April 1649, common land on the hill was occupied by a movement known as the Diggers, who began to farm there. The Diggers are often regarded as one of the world's first small-scale experiments in socialism and/or communism. The Diggers left the hill following a court case five months later. The occupation has been commemorated by The Land is Ours group, which briefly camped at the summit of the hill in 1995 and 1999.

Residences
Local builder Walter George Tarrant owned the land and created many of the houses on the estate.
Each house is required by local laws to have at least  of land, and houses are restricted to a maximum of 20 per cent of the plot.

The Neo-Georgian Hamstone House (1938) and its entrance lodge and garages, Long Wall (1964–68; designed by Leslie Gooday for himself) and Crow Clump, The Corbies and Yaffle Hill (1913, originally built as a single house, 'Crow Clump') on St George's Hill are each listed Grade II on the National Heritage List for England.

Geography
The hill is the lowest in Surrey to be listed by the national database of hills of Britain and Ireland, which records claims for all Munros and all other popularly used categories, ranking 36th and as a >50 tump.  The easterly peak is the highest point of the three boroughs in the north-west corner of Surrey and has the highest summit to be strictly private, a higher semi-private Surrey summit being a shallower rise in rough woodland at Ribs Down, Windlesham.  The summit is 255 feet (78 metres) above mean sea level (Ordnance Datum) and the minimum descent (notch/col) is 174 feet (53 metres).  This is to the south at a main road and school separating Chatley Heath in Wisley and Painshill Park, Cobham. With its broad summit this minimum prominence results in views of Surrey varying from one observation point to another — the uppermost storey of houses or natural clearings viewed along the estate roads.  The estate roads consists of tall, neat hedges, mature trees, tended grass verges and roads laid with tarmac as pictured.

The nearest railway is the South West Main Line and nearest motorway is the M25 motorway, both more than 165 feet (50 metres) below the summit and centred  from its centre respectively.

Golf club
The golf club was designed in 1912 by Harry Colt with the clubhouse being built in the early 1920s. The Red and Blue nines make up the main course at St George's Hill, with a third nine - the Green nine - upgraded in 1987 by Donald Steel, assisted by Jonathan Gaunt.

Tennis club
The tennis club has 15 artificial grass tennis courts (8 floodlit), 15 grass and 2 indoor tennis courts, 4 squash courts, gym, air-conditioned studio, 20m swimming pool, steam and sauna, bar and restaurants, creche and beauty spa.

Politics
The local political party is the St George's Hill Independents who are an independent political party.

Notable residents
 John Lennon - Beatles singer/songwriter and guitarist
 Ringo Starr - Beatles singer/songwriter and drummer
 Elton John - singer
 Alexander Perepilichny - allegedly poisoned Russian businessman and whistleblower
 Mian Muhammad Mansha - Forbes listed and the richest man in Pakistan
Shilpa Shetty - Indian actress
Theo Paphitis - entrepreneur and Dragons Den star
Cliff Richard - British singer
Tom Jones - singer
David Crouch - entrepreneur 
Nick Faldo - professional golfer
Eric Sykes - comedian
John Terry - professional footballer and coach
Jenson Button - British racing driver
Englebert Humperdinck - singer
Gordon Mills - musician, songwriter and manager
Dick Emery - comedian
Bill Martin - Songwriter

Other private estates
There are other estates in Elmbridge:
Burwood Park
Ashley Park

References

Gated communities in the United Kingdom
Golf clubs and courses in Surrey
Housing estates in England
Golf clubs and courses designed by Harry Colt
Weybridge, Surrey